Bangladesh Army Football Team , is an association football based in Dhaka, Bangladesh that competes in the National Football Championship, which is the main national district tournament in the country. They also participate in the Independence Cup and previously played in the Federation Cup.

The Army team consists of players who play professionally in the Bangladesh Premier League, Championship League, Dhaka League and the lower tiers of Dhaka football, while still being a member of the Bangladesh Army.

History

Officially founded on 26 March 1971, coinciding with Bangladesh's Independence Day, Bangladesh Army was home to many professional footballers shortly after. Hafizuddin Ahmed who was the first East Pakistani footballer to captain the Pakistan, was one of the first commissioned officers of the Bangladesh Army.

According to RSSSF, the earliest records of the Army taking part in a football competition was at the 1977/78 edition of the Aga Khan Gold Cup. During the tournament they suffered heavy defeats to Thai club Bangkok Bank (2–8) and Malaysia's Penang (1–4).

They also regularly took part in the Sher-e-Bangla Cup, where they were joint winner alongside Dhaka University in both 1980 and 1981, while in 1989 they beat their rivals in the final to gain sole ownership of the title.

2000s
Army started the new century by partaking in the 2000 Federation Cup, finishing bottom of their group. In the same year, they reached the Sher-e Bangla Cup final, losing to Noakhali   in the final.

In 2001, Army qualified for the 2001–02 National Football Championship after defeating Bangladesh Navy in the Service Zone final. In the main tournament, Army produced one of the upsets of the year by defeating Abahani Limited Dhaka by 2–1. Nonetheless, they failed to progress past the group-stage due to goal difference. In 2002, Army took part in the Federation Cup for the only the second time and finished third in their group. In 2004, Army enjoyed a relatively successful season, as they took part in the Federation Cup and also reachd the final of the Sher-e Bangla Cup (losing to Narayanganj) with striker Nasiruddin Chowdhury leading their way to the final with 5 goals.

The 2005–06 National Football Championship, was the last time Army took part in the tournament, while top-tier clubs still competed in it. Their only win in during the championship came against Nobanabin Somabesh. They also partook in the 2005 edition of the Federation Cup, losing in the quarter-final to Sheikh Russel KC 2–5. The following decade, Army played both the 2008 and 2009 Federation Cup, without much success.

2010s
For the majority of the 2010s, the Army's football team remained inactive. The only notable tournament they took part in was Inter-Service football tournament, in 2018. In the final, Army defeated Bangladesh Navy 4–3, and midfielder Sohel Rana's performances during the tournament earned him a Bangladesh Premier League contract with Rahmatganj MFS.

2020s
The start of the new decade saw the return of the National Football Championship (2020), as Army won the title for the first time. On 2 December 2021, Army stunned Mohammedan SC 2–1 in the 2021 Independence Cup, with goals from Ranju Sikdar and Sharier Emon.

On 8 April 2022, Army won the 9th Bangabundhu Bangladesh Games beating Sylhet District 2–0.

On 4 July 2022, Army retained the National Championship (2021–22) title, defeating Chittagong District 4–2 in the final, with striker Imtiaz Raihan scoring twice in the final and remained the highest scorer of the tournament with six goals.

Honours

Cups
Sher-e-Bangla Cup
Winners (3): 1980*, 1981*, 1989
Runner-up (2): 1982, 1990, 2000, 2004
Inter-Service Football Tournament 
Winners (1): 2018
 National Football Championship
Winners (2): 2020, 2021–22
Bangladesh Games
Winners (1): 2022

Notable players

The players below have senior international cap(s) for the Bangladesh national football team.

Nasiruddin Chowdhury (2000–2008)
Ashraful Islam Rana (2003—2014)
Mehedi Hasan Mithu (2015—present)
Mohamed Sohel Rana (2015–2018)

References

External links
 Bangladesh Army FT at globalsportsarchive.com

Bangladesh Army
Football clubs in Bangladesh
Military association football clubs in Bangladesh
Association football clubs established in 1972